The Battle of Lynchburg was fought on June 17–18, 1864, two miles outside Lynchburg, Virginia, as part of the American Civil War. The Union Army of West Virginia, under Maj. Gen. David Hunter, attempted to capture the city but was repulsed by Confederate Lt. Gen. Jubal Anderson Early.

Background
During the Civil War, Lynchburg was used as a supply and hospital center. It was also a connection in the railroad that supplied the Confederate States Army. It was for this reason that Hunter determined to capture it. In accordance with a plan formulated by Brig. Gen. William W. Averell, the infantry divisions of Brigadier Generals George Crook and Jeremiah C. Sullivan proceeded south from Staunton on June 10 alongside Averell's cavalry division.

However, Hunter had two major problems.  He was supposed to receive help from Maj. Gen. Philip Sheridan; who never showed up because he had suffered a major setback at the Battle of Trevilian Station and was forced to retreat to an area around Richmond and Petersburg.  The other, and perhaps more important, issue was that Hunter's supply lines were being harassed by the 43rd Battalion Virginia Cavalry, under Lt. Col. John S. Mosby. Between May 20 and June 17, only one supply wagon had reached Hunter.

At Lexington on June 11, Hunter fought with Confederate cavalry under Brig. Gen. John McCausland, who withdrew to Buchanan. Hunter ordered Col. Alfred N. Duffié to join him in Lexington with his cavalry division. While waiting, Hunter burned the Virginia Military Institute and the home of John Letcher, former Governor of Virginia. After being joined by Duffié on June 13, Hunter sent Averell to drive McCausland out of Buchanan and capture the bridge there across the James River, but McCausland burned the bridge and fled the town. Hunter joined Averell in Buchanan the following day before advancing via the road between the Peaks of Otter on June 15. His cavalry occupied Liberty that evening.

Meanwhile, Maj. Gen. John C. Breckinridge sent Brig. Gen. John D. Imboden and his cavalry to join McCausland. Breckinridge arrived in Lynchburg the next day. Maj. Gen. Daniel Harvey Hill and Brig. Gen. Harry T. Hays constructed a defensive line in the hills just southwest of the city. That afternoon, McCausland fell back to New London and skirmished with Averell's cavalry, which pursued him. The Union forces launched another attack on McCausland and Imboden that evening. The Confederates retreated from New London.

Battle

Early arrived in Lynchburg at one o'clock on June 17, having been sent by General Robert E. Lee. Three hours later, Averell encountered McCausland's and Imboden's dismounted cavalry entrenched at the Quaker Meeting House, four miles from the city. The Confederates were driven back after Col. Carr B. White's brigade moved in to support Averell. Two brigades of Major General Stephen Dodson Ramseur's division occupied the area around a redoubt two miles from the city and hindered the Union advance.

Hunter made Sandusky his headquarters and planned the attack on Early's defenses. That night, trains could be heard moving up and down the tracks.  Also, various instruments such as bugles and drums were heard by Hunter's troops. Even the people of Lynchburg made noise by having bands play and citizens scream. Their goal was to make the Confederate army seem larger than it really was.

On June 18, Major Generals Arnold Elzey and Robert Ransom, Jr. arrived from the Confederate capital of Richmond, Virginia. Elzey assumed command of Breckinridge's infantry and dismounted cavalry while Ransom superseded Imboden as commander of the mounted cavalry. Early elected to remain defensive and wait for the rest of the Second Corps to arrive. The redoubt now known as Fort Early was at the center of the Confederate line, with Maj. Gen. John Brown Gordon's division on the left and Brig. Gen. William G. Lewis's brigade on the right. McCausland commanded the right flank, which included a redoubt, and Elzey's command defended the area between it and Lewis' brigade. Col. Scott Shipp's VMI cadets were placed in reserve at Spring Hill Cemetery while the inner defenses were occupied by the Confederate Home Guard.

Hunter, still not convinced that Lee had sent reinforcements to Lynchburg, deployed Sullivan's and Crook's divisions in front of the Confederate center, with Averell in reserve, and sent an order to Duffié to attack the Confederate right. Reconnoitering the line in an effort to find a weak spot to push his infantry through, Hunter ruled out a direct attack on the redoubts, for they appeared too strong. He allowed Lt. Col. Henry A. du Pont to deploy his thirty-two cannons. Crook was sent to flank the Confederate left, but marched a few miles before finding it impracticable. The Confederates attacked Sullivan and du Pont, who managed to hold them at bay until Crook returned. The Confederates fell back after a half-hour of fighting, but spent the next hour and twenty minutes attempting to break through the gap between Sullivan and Duffié before withdrawing to their earthworks. A regiment of Col. Rutherford B. Hayes' brigade pursued them but were beaten back.

Meanwhile, McCausland succeeded in holding off Duffié's assaults. As ammunition ran short, both Hunter and Duffié became convinced that they were outnumbered. Early then prepared to begin an attack of his own, but Hunter retreated at nightfall.

Aftermath
Early's army moved sixty miles in three days.  At that point, Early called off the pursuit and waited for Hunter to make a move.  Hunter decided to move across the Shenandoah Valley and into West Virginia.  Hunter's retreat made it possible for Early to move up the Shenandoah Valley freely.  Early's army advanced up through Maryland, defeated a Union force at the Battle of Monocacy, and reached the outskirts of Washington, D.C. before being halted at the Battle of Fort Stevens.

References

 http://www.historyofwar.org/articles/battles_lynchburg.html
 https://web.archive.org/web/20110927120821/http://www.civilwarhistory.com/_122199/battleoflynchburg.htm
 https://web.archive.org/web/20081001081511/http://www.discoverlynchburg.org/civilwar/civilwar.htm
 Christian, W. Asbury.Lynchburg and Its People.Lynchburg: J.P. Bell, 1900

External links
 National Park Service Lynchburg Campaign- June 14 - June 22, 1864
 National Park Service Battle Detail -  Lynchburg

Valley campaigns of 1864
Battles of the Eastern Theater of the American Civil War
Confederate victories of the American Civil War
Battles of the American Civil War in Virginia
1864 in Virginia
June 1864 events